Early modern yoga was the form of yoga created and presented to the Western world by Madame Blavatsky, Swami Vivekananda and others in the late 19th century. It embodied the period's distaste for yoga postures (asanas) as practised by Nath yogins by not mentioning them. As such it differed markedly from the prevailing yoga as exercise developed in the 20th century by Yogendra, Kuvalayananda, and Krishnamacharya, which was predominantly physical, consisting mainly or entirely of asanas.

Yoga for the Western world

Early modern yoga was created and presented to the Western world in different forms by Vivekananda, Madame Blavatsky, and others in the late 19th century. It embodied the period's distaste for yoga postures and hatha yoga more generally, as practised by the despised Nath yogins, by not mentioning them. 

Blavatsky, who co-founded the Theosophical Society in 1875, helped to pave the way for the spread of yoga in the West by encouraging interest in occult and esoteric doctrines and a vision of the "mystical East". She had travelled to India in 1852-3, and became greatly interested in yoga in general, while despising and distrusting hatha yoga, which she frequently contrasted with her Theosophical version of "true yoga". Her Theosophy accordingly views modern asana-based yoga as hatha yoga, a combination of "good exercise", in which it is not much interested, and meditation. It is rather more interested in mantra yoga, which it compares to Western plainsong, stating that it is useful for spiritual awareness; and in other forms of yoga such as karma yoga, the path of action; bhakti yoga, the path of devotion; and jnana yoga, the path of knowledge, which Blavatsky thought the yoga most suitable for the Western world. Finally, Theosophy considers raja yoga, which "incorporates the main features of all the others", to be the royal road to self-realisation as "a divine immortal being identical with the universal Divine Life."

In the 1890s, Vivekananda taught a mixture of yoga breathwork (pranayama), meditation, and the distinctively Western idea of positive thinking, derived from the new thought movement. He explicitly rejected the practice of asanas and hatha yoga. High-caste Hindus like him had traditionally held low-caste beggars, fakirs, and yogins in contempt for practising dramatic asanas in return for money. His attitude was reinforced by the equally ancient distaste of Western visitors to India, including both scholars and colonial officers, for such street people and any postures they were seen to practice.

Successor

A few decades later, a very different form of yoga, the prevailing yoga as exercise, was created by Yogendra, Kuvalayananda, and Krishnamacharya, starting in the 1920s. It was predominantly physical, consisting mainly or entirely of asanas. They advocated these under the guise of the supposed specific medical benefits of particular postures, encouraged by the prevailing Indian nationalism which needed something to build an image of a strong and energetic nation. The yoga that they created, however, was taken up predominantly in the English-speaking world, starting with America and Britain.

References

Sources

 
 

Modern yoga